Gasthaus Sanct Peter is a historic guest house located in Ahr wine region in Bad Neuenahr-Ahrweiler, Rhineland-Palatinate, Germany. It is one of Germany's Top 100 restaurants and has a tradition of culture and hotel services from 1246.

The name was given by Cologne Cathedral lords, the inn owners until 1805. In 20th century the entire Sanct Peter estate acquired the Brogsitter family, which lived in the Ahr Valley for over 400 years.

See also 
List of oldest companies

References

External links 
Homepage in German
Profile in German
Profile on Arhrsteig-Ahr.de

Hotels in Germany
Restaurants in Germany
Buildings and structures in Rhineland-Palatinate
13th-century establishments in the Holy Roman Empire